The 2002 season was the tenth season since the establishment of the J.League. The league began on March 2, 2002 and ended on November 30, 2002. The Suntory Championship was not held, because Júbilo Iwata was winner of both stages. At the end Sanfrecce Hiroshima and Consadole Sapporo were relegated to J2.

General

Promotion and relegation
 At the end of the 2001 Season, Kyoto Purple Sanga and Vegalta Sendai were promoted to J1.
 At the end of the 2001 Season, Avispa Fukuoka and Cerezo Osaka were relegated to J2.

Changes in competition formats
 Extra time was scratched for J.League Division 2. After regulation time, clubs in J2 now receives 3pts for a win, 1pt for a tie, and 0pts for a loss. (NOTE: J1 still has extra time)

Changes in clubs
none

Honours

Clubs

Following sixteen clubs participated in J.League Division 1 during 2002 season. Of these clubs, Kyoto Purple Sanga and Vegalta Sendai were promoted from Division 2.

 Kashima Antlers
 Urawa Red Diamonds
 JEF United Ichihara
 Kashiwa Reysol
 FC Tokyo
 Tokyo Verdy 1969
 Yokohama F. Marinos
 Shimizu S-Pulse
 Jublio Iwata
 Nagoya Grampus Eight
 Gamba Osaka
 Consadole Sapporo
 Vissel Kobe
 Sanfrecce Hiroshima
 Vegalta Sendai 
 Kyoto Purple Sanga

First stage

Second stage

Championship 
The Suntory Championship was not held, because Júbilo Iwata was winner of both stages.

Overall table

Top scorers

Awards

Individual

Best Eleven

* The number in brackets denotes the number of times that the footballer has appeared in the Best 11.

Attendance

External links
 J. League Official Stats

J1 League seasons
1
Japan
Japan